Frank Herbert Eddolls (July 5, 1921 – August 13, 1961) was a defenceman in the National Hockey League who played for the Montreal Canadiens and New York Rangers, and coached the Chicago Black Hawks in 1954–55.  He won the Stanley Cup with Montreal in 1946. Eddolls is perhaps best remembered as being a returning piece in one of the most lopsided trades of all time, which saw him being moved  by the Toronto Maple Leafs in exchange for future Hockey Hall of Fame member Ted Kennedy, who was later voted by multiple publications to be one of the greatest hockey players of all time.

Eddolls is known as one of the very few defencemen who consistently succeeded in defending against the legendary Maurice "Rocket" Richard.

Frank was playing golf on August 13, 1961 with friends at the Cherry Hill Country Club in Ridgeway, Ontario, one friend being Stan Mikita, when he complained on the 9th hole of heartburn. On the 17th hole, he collapsed and died of a heart attack.

Career statistics

Coaching record

Transactions
 June 7, 1940 - Rights traded to Toronto by Montreal for the rights to Joe Benoit.
 September 10, 1943 - Traded to Montreal by Toronto for the rights to Ted Kennedy.
 August 19, 1947 - Traded to NY Rangers by Montreal with Buddy O'Connor for Hal Laycoe, Joe Bell and George Robertson.

References

External links
Frank Eddolls Obituary at LostHockey.com

1921 births
1961 deaths
Anglophone Quebec people
Canadian ice hockey defencemen
Chicago Blackhawks coaches
Ice hockey people from Montreal
Montreal Canadiens players
New York Rangers players
People from Lachine, Quebec
Stanley Cup champions
Canadian ice hockey coaches